The Grange Club is a cricket and sports club in the Stockbridge district of Edinburgh, Scotland. The cricket ground, commonly known as The Grange, is the regular home of the Scotland national cricket team, and is situated adjacent to the Edinburgh Academy sports ground, which is in Raeburn Place.

History
The Grange Club was founded in 1832, in The Grange district of Edinburgh. In 1872 it moved to its current location at Raeburn Place in the Stockbridge district and has hosted out of its pavilion since 1894. The pavilion cost £1,400 and was officially opened on 29 June 1895 by Lord Moncrieff. The pavilion was restored in 1998 at a cost of £450,000.

After the Scottish Cricket Union disbanded in 1884 The Grange Club assumed responsibility as the governing body of cricket in Scotland for a time and still holds considerable national influence.

The decorative scheme to the interior of the Pavilion is designed to complement the exterior. The Long Room, is modelled on the Marylebone Cricket Club's 'Long Room' at Lord's Cricket Ground, London.

The Club was also associated with The Dyvours Club, Edinburgh's oldest lawn tennis club, who were founded in 1883, and played on the grounds.

Cricket

The Grange has hosted numerous high profile international matches over the years featuring teams such as Australia, Pakistan and England. Some of the world's finest cricketers have played at The Grange, from W. G. Grace in 1895 and Donald Bradman in 1948 to Brian Lara in 1995, Shane Warne and Andrew Flintoff. The ground has hosted Scotland's home matches in ECB domestic cricket competitions.

International Venue
The Grange hosted Scotland's first official One Day International (ODI) outside of Cricket World Cup on 27 June 2006. A capacity crowd saw Scotland lose by five wickets to Pakistan. It was selected as a venue to host matches in the 2015 ICC World Twenty20 Qualifier tournament.

Clubs
The Grange Club is the home ground for: 
The Grange Cricket Club. The Grange Cricket Club is an amateur cricket club whose 1st XI play in the Cricket Scotland Eastern Premiership, the top tier of cricket for teams of the East of Scotland Cricket Association (ESCA) and Strathmore & Perthshire Cricket Union regional associations. The club 2nd XI play in the ESCA Baillie Gifford Championship Division. The Grange Cricket Club has won the Scottish Cup six times, the East of Scotland League (1953–1996) fourteen times and the Scottish National Cricket League (1997–present) five times.
The Eastern Knights. As of 2016 The Grange Club has also been one of the home grounds for the Eastern Knights, who play in the Regional Pro Series, the highest, and only professional, tier of Scottish cricket.
The Scottish National Cricket Team. The Grange is perhaps most importantly home to the Scottish National Cricket Team, who represent Scotland for cricket in international matches.

Cricket World Cup
This stadium hosted two ODIs during the 1999 Cricket World Cup.

Scotland v England June 2018

Only ODI

International Centuries

One-Day Internationals
Fourteen ODI centuries have been scored on the ground.

Five Wicket Hauls

One Day Internationals
Four ODI five-wicket hauls have been taken on the ground.

Twenty20 Internationals
Only one twenty-20 five-wicket hauls have been taken on the ground.

Squash, tennis and hockey
The Grange also hosts other sports as well as cricket. It has five squash courts, which support men's and ladies' teams that compete at all regional and national levels. Uniquely for a private club in Scotland, The Grange is also home to The Dyvours Club which has four grass tennis courts and four floodlit astroturf courts. Grange Hockey Club supports eight men's hockey teams which represents a broad range of ability. The 1st XI recently played in Europe, having won the Scottish Cup, and also play in the Euro Hockey League. The Grange Club is also home to Grange Edinburgh Ladies Hockey Club with four teams. All the constituent clubs have vibrant junior sections.

See also
Edinburgh Academical Cricket Club
Heriot's Cricket Club

References

External links
 
 The Grange
 Grange Cricket Club Website
 Grange Men's Hockey Club Website
 Grange Edinburgh Ladies(GEL) Hockey Club Website
 Grange Squash Club website
 Grange Dyvours Tennis Club website
 Cricket Scotland ODI webpage
 Grange 175th Anniversary Yearbook
 Grange Team in Euro Hockey League

Sports venues in Edinburgh
Cricket grounds in Scotland
Category B listed buildings in Edinburgh
Listed sports venues in Scotland
Scottish club cricket teams
1832 establishments in Scotland
Sports venues completed in 1832
Sports teams in Edinburgh
1999 Cricket World Cup stadiums
Clubs and societies in Edinburgh